CBSI may refer to:

 CBSI-FM, Sept-Îles, Quebec, Canada; a French-language radio station
 CBS Interactive, a division of the American media corporation CBS.
 ConAmor Broadcasting Systems, Inc. (CBSI), former name of DCG Radio-TV Network
 Community Bank System, Inc. (CBSI), a U.S. national bank network
 Catholic Boy Scouts of Ireland (CBSI), Irish scouting organization
 Clan Buchanan Society International (CBSI) the international society for the Scottish Clan Buchanan
 Cellular Business Systems Inc. (CBSI) billing company founded by Arlene Harris

See also
 CBS (disambiguation)
 BSI (disambiguation)
 WBSI (disambiguation)
 KBSI (disambiguation)